Hoo Kam Chiu (born 7 May 1910, date of death unknown) was a Hong Kong sports shooter. He competed in the 50 metre pistol event at the 1964 Summer Olympics. He also competed at the 1954 and 1966 Asian Games, and won bronze in the 50 metre pistol event at the latter.

References

External links

1910 births
Year of death missing
Hong Kong male sport shooters
Olympic shooters of Hong Kong
Shooters at the 1964 Summer Olympics
Place of birth missing
Asian Games medalists in shooting
Shooters at the 1954 Asian Games
Shooters at the 1966 Asian Games
Asian Games bronze medalists for Hong Kong
Medalists at the 1966 Asian Games